Fuoni Kibondeni is a village on the Tanzanian island of Unguja, part of Zanzibar. It is located on the central west coast of the island, 18 kilometres north of the capital Zanzibar City.

In 2016 reports there were 15,400 people in the ward in 2012. The ward has .

References
Finke, J. (2006) The Rough Guide to Zanzibar (2nd edition). New York: Rough Guides.

Villages in Zanzibar